The Outcome Questionnaire 45 (OQ-45), created by Gary M Burlingame and Michael J. Lambert at Brigham Young University, is a 45-item multiple-choice self-report inventory used to measure psychotherapy progress in adults patients. The OQ-45 is currently in its second version (OQ-45.2), which was released in October 2013 by OQ Measures, the company founded by Burlingame and Lambert.

Clinical use
The instrument was designed as a brief scale to measure the subjective experience of a person, as well as the way they function in the world. Authors intended it to be a low cost instrument with a quick administration time that is sensitive to change across time. The inventory is not intended to be used for diagnostic purposes.

Format
The OQ-45 contains 45 items. Individuals are asked to describe their experiences in the last week, using a multiple choice format. This response format is consistent across questions: Never, Rarely, Sometimes, Frequently, and Almost Always. The questionnaire was originally developed as a paper version, and was later made available in mobile and web-based formats.

Domains of Measurement
The OQ-45 measures progress across three different domains of experience: 
 Symptom Distress (SD): Measures an individual's degree of subjective discomfort
 Interpersonal Relations (IR): Measures impairment in interpersonal functioning
 Social Role (SR): Measures impairment in functioning at work and in other social roles

Scoring
Points are assigned for each response using the following scoring rubric: Never (0), Rarely (1), Sometimes (2), Frequently (3), and Almost Always (4). Individual subscales are totaled using addition, after reverse-coding procedures are performed. Higher scores indicate more severe distress and functional impairment. The Symptom Distress subscale contains 25 items, and scores range from 0 to 100. The Interpersonal Relations subscale contains 11 items, and scores range from 0 to 44. The Social Role subscale contains 9 items, and scores range from 0 to 36. A total score (TOT) is calculated by summing the subscales, and scores range from 0 to 180. The instrument's administration and scoring manual provides thresholds for clinically significant distress and impairment, and for reliable change.

See also
 Gary M. Burlingame
Michael J. Lambert 
 Outcome measure
 Psychological evaluation

External links
 OQ-45.2 Website

Mental disorders screening and assessment tools